Hassan Nasrallah (born 1960) is a Lebanese cleric and political leader, and third secretary-general of Hezbollah.

It may also refer to:

 Hassan Nasrallah (businessman) (1881–1959), Iraqi businessman
 Hassan Nasrallah (footballer) (born 1982), Lebanese footballer